Podgórze  is a Polish village in the Gmina Barlinek administrative district. The district is part of Myślibórz County, and the county is part of the West Pomeranian Voivodeship found in northwestern Poland.

Please see the History of Pomerania to learn more of the region's past.

References

Villages in Myślibórz County